Linus Benedict Torvalds (born 28 December 1969) is a Finnish software engineer who is the creator and, historically, the lead developer of the Linux kernel, used by Linux distributions and other operating systems such as Android. He also created the distributed version control system Git.

He was honored, along with Shinya Yamanaka, with the 2012 Millennium Technology Prize by the Technology Academy Finland "in recognition of his creation of a new open source operating system for computers leading to the widely used Linux kernel." He is also the recipient of the 2014 IEEE Computer Society Computer Pioneer Award and the 2018 IEEE Masaru Ibuka Consumer Electronics Award.

Life and career

Early years 
Torvalds was born in Helsinki, Finland, the son of journalists Anna and Nils Torvalds, the grandson of statistician Leo Törnqvist and of poet Ole Torvalds, and the great-grandson of journalist and soldier Toivo Karanko. His parents were campus radicals at the University of Helsinki in the 1960s. His family belongs to the Swedish-speaking minority in Finland. He was named after Linus Pauling, the Nobel Prize-winning American chemist, although in the book Rebel Code: Linux and the Open Source Revolution, he is quoted as saying, "I think I was named equally for Linus the Peanuts cartoon character", noting that this made him "half Nobel Prize-winning chemist and half blanket-carrying cartoon character".

Torvalds attended the University of Helsinki from 1988 to 1996, graduating with a master's degree in computer science from the NODES research group. His academic career was interrupted after his first year of study when he joined the Finnish Navy Nyland Brigade in the summer of 1989, selecting the 11-month officer training program to fulfill the mandatory military service of Finland. He gained the rank of second lieutenant, with the role of an artillery observer. He bought computer science professor Andrew Tanenbaum's book Operating Systems: Design and Implementation, in which Tanenbaum describes MINIX, an educational stripped-down version of Unix. In 1990, Torvalds resumed his university studies, and was exposed to Unix for the first time in the form of a DEC MicroVAX running ULTRIX. His MSc thesis was titled Linux: A Portable Operating System.

His interest in computers began with a VIC-20 at the age of 11 in 1981. He started programming for it in BASIC, then later by directly accessing the 6502 CPU in machine code (he did not utilize assembly language). He then purchased a Sinclair QL, which he modified extensively, especially its operating system. "Because it was so hard to get software for it in Finland", he wrote his own assembler and editor "(in addition to Pac-Man graphics libraries)" for the QL, and a few games. He wrote a Pac-Man clone, Cool Man. On 5 January 1991 he purchased an Intel 80386-based clone of IBM PC before receiving his MINIX copy, which in turn enabled him to begin work on Linux.

Linux 

The first Linux prototypes were publicly released in late 1991. Version 1.0 was released on 14 March 1994.

Torvalds first encountered the GNU Project in 1991 when another Swedish-speaking computer science student, Lars Wirzenius, took him to the University of Technology to listen to free software guru Richard Stallman's speech.  Torvalds used Stallman's GNU General Public License version 2 (GPLv2) for his Linux kernel.

After a visit to Transmeta in late 1996, Torvalds accepted a position at the company in California, where he worked from February 1997 to June 2003. He then moved to the Open Source Development Labs, which has since merged with the Free Standards Group to become the Linux Foundation, under whose auspices he continues to work. In June 2004, Torvalds and his family moved to Dunthorpe, Oregon to be closer to the OSDL's headquarters in Beaverton.

From 1997 to 1999, he was involved in 86open, helping select the standard binary format for Linux and Unix. In 1999, he was named by the MIT Technology Review TR100 as one of the world's top 100 innovators under age 35.

In 1999, Red Hat and VA Linux, both leading developers of Linux-based software, presented Torvalds with stock options in gratitude for his creation. That year both companies went public and Torvalds's share value briefly shot up to about US$20 million.

His personal mascot is a penguin nicknamed Tux, which has been widely adopted by the Linux community as the Linux kernel's mascot.

Although Torvalds believes "open source is the only right way to do software", he also has said that he uses the "best tool for the job", even if that includes proprietary software. He was criticized for his use and alleged advocacy of the proprietary BitKeeper software for version control in the Linux kernel. He subsequently wrote a free-software replacement for it called Git.

In 2008, Torvalds stated that he used the Fedora Linux distribution because it had fairly good support for the PowerPC processor architecture, which he favored at the time. He confirmed this in a 2012 interview. He has also posted updates about his choice of desktop environment, often in response to perceived feature regressions.

The Linux Foundation currently sponsors Torvalds so he can work full-time on improving Linux.

Torvalds is known for vocally disagreeing with other developers on the Linux kernel mailing list. Calling himself a "really unpleasant person", he explained, "I'd like to be a nice person and curse less and encourage people to grow rather than telling them they are idiots. I'm sorry—I tried, it's just not in me." His attitude, which he considers necessary for making his points clear, has drawn criticism from Intel programmer Sage Sharp and systemd developer Lennart Poettering, among others.

On Sunday, 16 September 2018, the Linux kernel Code of Conflict was suddenly replaced by a new Code of Conduct based on the Contributor Covenant. Shortly thereafter, in the release notes for Linux 4.19-rc4, Torvalds apologized for his behavior, calling his personal attacks of the past "unprofessional and uncalled for" and announced a period of "time off" to "get some assistance on how to understand people's emotions and respond appropriately". It soon transpired that these events followed The New Yorker approaching Torvalds with a series of questions critical of his conduct. Following the release of Linux 4.19 on 22 October 2018, Torvalds returned to maintaining the kernel.

The Linus/Linux connection 

Initially, Torvalds wanted to call the kernel he developed Freax (a combination of "free", "freak", and the letter X to indicate that it was a Unix-like system), but his friend Ari Lemmke, who administered the FTP server where the kernel was first hosted, named Torvalds' directory linux.

Authority and trademark 
As of 2006, approximately 2% of the Linux kernel was written by Torvalds himself. Because thousands have contributed to it, his percentage is still one of the largest. However, he said in 2012 that his own personal contribution is now mostly merging code written by others, with little programming. He retains the highest authority to decide which new code is incorporated into the standard Linux kernel.

Torvalds holds the Linux trademark and monitors its use, chiefly through the Linux Mark Institute.

Other software

Git

On 3 April 2005, Torvalds began development on Git, version control software that later became widely used. On 26 July 2005, he turned over Git's maintenance to Junio Hamano, a major project contributor.

Subsurface
Subsurface is software for logging and planning scuba dives, which Torvalds began developing in late 2011. It is free and open-source software distributed under the terms of the GNU General Public License version 2. Dirk Hohndel became its head maintainer in late 2012.

Personal life 

Torvalds is married to Tove Torvalds (née Monni), a six-time Finnish national karate champion, whom he met in late 1993. He was running introductory computer laboratory exercises for students and instructed the course attendees to send him an e-mail as a test, to which Tove responded with an e-mail asking for a date. They were later married and have three daughters, two of whom were born in the United States. The Linux kernel's reboot system call accepts their dates of birth (written in hexadecimal) as magic values.

Torvalds has described himself as "completely a-religious—atheist", adding, "I find that people seem to think religion brings morals and appreciation of nature. I actually think it detracts from both. It gives people the excuse to say, 'Oh, nature was just created,' and so the act of creation is seen to be something miraculous. I appreciate the fact that, 'Wow, it's incredible that something like this could have happened in the first place. He later added that while in Europe religion is mostly a personal issue, in the United States it has become very politicized. When discussing the issue of church and state separation, he said, "Yeah, it's kind of ironic that in many European countries, there is actually a kind of legal binding between the state and the state religion." In "Linus the Liberator", a story about the March LinuxWorld Conference, Torvalds says: "There are like two golden rules in life. One is 'Do unto others as you would want them to do unto you.' For some reason, people associate this with Christianity. I'm not a Christian. I'm agnostic. The other rule is 'Be proud of what you do.

In 2010, Torvalds became a United States citizen and registered to vote in the United States. As of that year, he was unaffiliated with any U.S. political party, saying, "I have way too much personal pride to want to be associated with any of them, quite frankly."

Linus developed an interest in scuba diving in the early 2000s and has achieved numerous certifications, leading him to create the Subsurface project.

Awards and achievements

Media recognition 
Time magazine has recognized Torvalds multiple times:
 In 2000, he was 17th in their Time 100: The Most Important People of the Century poll.
 In 2004, he was named one of the most influential people in the world by Time magazine.
 In 2006, the magazine's Europe edition named him one of the revolutionary heroes of the past 60 years.

InfoWorld presented him with the 2000 Award for Industry Achievement. In 2005, Torvalds appeared as one of "the best managers" in a survey by BusinessWeek. In 2006, Business 2.0 magazine named him one of "10 people who don't matter" because the growth of Linux has shrunk Torvalds's individual impact.

In summer 2004, viewers of YLE (the Finnish Broadcasting Company) placed Torvalds 16th in the network's 100 Greatest Finns. In 2010, as part of a series called The Britannica Guide to the World's Most Influential People, Torvalds was listed among The 100 Most Influential Inventors of All Time.

On 11 October 2017, the Linux company SUSE made a song titled "Linus Said".

Bibliography 
 
 
 Moody, Glyn: Rebel Code. Engl. the beginning of work: Rebel Code. Eng. Riikka Toivanen and Heikki Karjalainen. In January 2001. .
 Nikkanen, Tuula: The Linux story. Satku, 2000. .

See also 
 Linus's law
 Tanenbaum–Torvalds debate
 List of computer pioneers

References

Further reading

External links 

 
 Linus' blog at Blogger (last post in 2011)
 Linus Torvalds and His Five Entrepreneurial Lessons at AllBusiness.com
 
 
 Ten years of NODES
 Linus Torvalds: Linux succeeded thanks to selfishness and trust
 Torvalds interview
 

 
1969 births
Academic staff of the University of Helsinki
American agnostics
American atheists
American bloggers
American computer programmers
American software engineers
Finnish agnostics
Finnish atheists
Finnish bloggers
Finnish computer programmers
Finnish emigrants to the United States
Free software programmers
Linux kernel programmers
Linux people
Living people
Open source people
People from Dunthorpe, Oregon
People in information technology
Swedish-speaking Finns
University of Helsinki alumni
Writers from Helsinki
Open source advocates
Finnish software engineers
Linus
People with acquired American citizenship